George Theodore Selwyn (30 July 1887 – 30 May 1957) was an eminent priest in the middle part of the 20th century.

He was educated at St Lawrence College, Ramsgate and Corpus Christi College, Cambridge. After a curacy at St Matthew’s Church, Bayswater he emigrated to India as a CMS missionary, eventually becoming Principal of St John’s College, Palamcottah and then Bishop of Tinnevelly in  1945. He retired in 1953 and died four years later.

References

1887 births
People educated at St Lawrence College, Ramsgate
Alumni of Corpus Christi College, Cambridge
English Anglican missionaries
20th-century Anglican bishops in India
Anglican bishops of Tinnevelly
1957 deaths
Anglican missionaries in India
Missionary educators